Hendrik Hermanus Joel Ngantung (1 March 1927 – 12 December 1991), better known as Henk Ngantung was an Indonesian autodidact painter and politician of Minahasan descent. He was appointed Deputy Governor by President Sukarno and then became the Governor of Jakarta of minority briefly between 1964 and 1965, the first Christian of the Catholic faith to hold this important post in predominantly Muslim Indonesia.

Henk Ngantung was born in the Minahasa heartland of North Sulawesi province in the capital city of Manado to a poor family. Henk was an autodidact painter without any formal education. Together with Chairil Anwar and Asrul Sani, he co-founded the Indonesian artistic movement Gelanggang (meaning the arena). He was also member of the China-Indonesia Friendship from 1955 to 1958.

Henk Ngantung was married to Hetty Evelyn "Evie" Mamesah and they had four children, Maya Ngantung, Genie Ngantung, Kamang Ngantung and Karno Ngantung.

He became Deputy governor of Jakarta during the reign of governor Soemarno Sosroatmodjo. President Sukarno entrusted him of turning Jakarta into a city of culture based on his work as an artist. After holding the post of deputy governor from 1960 to 1964, he succeeded Soemarno Sosroatmodjo as governor of Jakarta but very briefly 1964–1965 before Soemarno Sosroatmodjo retaking the position in 1965 again briefly until 1966. His appointment was vehemently opposed for his left-wing ideology with some opponents accusing him of being a communist.

From 1965 onwards, he consecrated his life to the arts. He lived in poverty, suffered bad health and developed heart disease and glaucoma. He lost eyesight completely in his right eye, and just 30% vision in the left eye, but continued painting with great difficulty. In 1990, the Indonesian businessman and philanthropist Ciputra sponsored Henk Ngantung's one and only official exhibition just a month before his death on 12 December 1991. His portrait of Brigadier John Mellsop (1907–1980), painted in Java in 1946, is in the collection of the National Army Museum, London.

References

1921 births
1991 deaths
People from Manado
Minahasa people
Indonesian Roman Catholics
Governors of Jakarta
20th-century Indonesian painters